Coiled coil may refer to:
 Coiled coil, a structural motif in proteins
 Coiled coil filament, a type of filament in incandescent light bulbs

See also
 Coil (disambiguation)